Symon Gould (1894 – November 24, 1963) was an American politician and vegetarianism activist. He was the co-founder of the American Vegetarian Party, formed in 1948.

Biography

Gould was a bibliophile, rare book dealer, and director of the American Library Service.

Gould was also the founder of the International Film Arts Guild, based in New York City.  According to one account, he edited the American print of the silent film Nosferatu.  Gould is credited with boosting the "art house theater" (or "little cinema") movement by his  screenings at the Cameo Theatre in New York.

Gould died in of cancer at Roosevelt Hospital in 1964. He was 70 years old. Prior to his death, Gould resided on 150 West 47th Street in Midtown Manhattan.

Vegetarianism

In 1948, Gould co-founded the American Vegetarian Party with John Maxwell, a naturopathic physician and restaurateur. Gould was editor of the American Vegetarian magazine. He was their candidate for President of the United States in the 1960 and 1964 presidential elections.

Gould was also secretary of the Vegetarian Society of New York and urged the government to take vegetarianism into account under any rationing plan during World War II. In 1946 in New York City, Gould moderated a debate sponsored by the League for Public Discussion on meat eating versus vegetarianism.

Gould was a lacto-vegetarian. He fasted for 21 days every year.

He was a promoter of Herbert M. Shelton's American Natural Hygiene Society.

References

Further reading

 Chuck Fries and Irv Wilson (2003). We'll Never Be Young Again: Remembering the Last Days of John F. Kennedy 
 Karen Iacobbo (2004). Vegetarian America : A History 
 Ross Melnick and Adrea Fuchs (2004). Cinema Treasures: A New Look at Classic Movie Theaters 

1894 births
1963 deaths
1952 United States vice-presidential candidates
1956 United States vice-presidential candidates
20th-century American politicians
American vegetarianism activists
Candidates in the 1960 United States presidential election
Candidates in the 1964 United States presidential election
American Vegetarian Party politicians
Bibliophiles
Fasting advocates
Orthopaths